Earthworks may refer to:

Construction
Earthworks (archaeology), human-made constructions that modify the land contour
Earthworks (engineering), civil engineering works created by moving or processing quantities of soil
Earthworks (military), military fortifications built in the field during a campaign or siege

Arts and media
Earthworks (novel), a novel by Brian Aldiss
Earthworks (band), a jazz band led by drummer Bill Bruford
Earthworks (album), the band's self-titled debut album
"Earthworks" (song), a 1993 song by Kerbdog
Land art or Earth art

Other uses
Earthworks (company), an audio equipment company
Earthworks High School, an experimental school in Ann Arbor, Michigan